Veronica arvensis, common names: wall speedwell, corn speedwell, common speedwell, rock speedwell, field speedwell, is an annual flowering plant in the plantain family Plantaginaceae. The species is a native European plant and a common weed in gardens, pastures, waste places and cultivated land.

Description
The leaves are oppositely arranged in pairs about the stem. The lower leaves have short petioles; the upper are sessile. Each leaf,  in length, is ovate, or triangular with a truncated or slightly cordate base, with coarse teeth. Borne in a raceme, initially compact but elongating with age, the flowers are pale blue to blue-violet, 2 to 3 mm in diameter, four-lobed with a narrow lowest lobe. The fruit capsules are heart-shaped and shorter than the sepal-teeth. It flowers from April to October.

Distribution
It is native to Africa, Asia and Europe.

Growth
Veronica arvensis plants go through changes in their germination due to temperature and light, furthermore explaining what controls the timing of growth in buried seed reserves. These weeds tend to germinate in consistent temperature ranges of 10 degrees Celsius to 15 degrees Celsius. If they do not make the first autumn cycle of growth, they can grow in the following spring. Overall, light is a major source to their survival and growth. In other words, they can grow in darkness, however they will remain dormant unless they get light.

Uses
It is a medicinal plant.

References

Flora of Africa
Flora of Asia
Flora of Europe
Medicinal plants
Plants described in 1753
Taxa named by Carl Linnaeus
arvensis